West Omaha is a geographic area of Omaha, Nebraska, that comprises all points within the Omaha metropolitan area west of 90th Street.

Communities
West Omaha is home to several communities, including the historical Boys Town. Ralston, a city in south-central Douglas County surrounded by Omaha on three sides and roughly bounded by 72nd to the east, 84th to the west, L on the north, and Harrison on the south. Elkhorn, on the outskirts of western Omaha and annexed in 2007; Millard, a broad area of southwest Omaha and annexed in 1971. Chalco, an unincorporated area southwest of Omaha in northern Sarpy County, is also widely regarded as a part of west Omaha.

Borders
West Omaha is bordered by 90th Street on the east, Harrison Street on the south, the Platte River on the west, and Rainwood Road to the north.

Shopping Centers in West Omaha

See also
Neighborhoods of Omaha, Nebraska

References

West Omaha, Nebraska